Irina Aleksandrovna Allegrova (born 20 January 1952) is a Russian singer. She is a People's Artist of Russia (2010).

Biography
Was born in Rostov-on-Don in 1952. Her father Alexander Sarkisov, an ethnic Armenian, took the surname Allegrov as a pseudonym when he was just 17 and Irina was born with this surname (Allegrova). Her Russian mother was Serafima Sosnovskaya. Allegrova was brought up in a theatrical family with famous people who frequented their house and impressed the young girl. She spent her early life in Baku, Azerbaijan SSR where she studied piano and ballet. Allegrova gave birth to one daughter, Lala, at a young age. She left Lala with her parents and moved to Moscow to become a singer at the age of 22.

In 1985, Allegrova met Oscar Feltsman, who gave her a chance at a solo career and wrote several songs for her. Then, in 1987 she became soloist in David Tukhmanov's band – Electroclub.

Her debut album "My Destined One – Suzheny/Wanderer – Strannik" was written and produced by her neighbor and friend Igor Nikolaev.  The album, supported by the single "Wanderer" (1991–1992) became No.1 and stayed No.1 for nearly a full year.

Allegrova's next album was "Ugonschitsa" (1994–1995), which won a Russian Grammy (Ovatsiya) for Best Pop Female Star. She toured the United States after that album's release.

She began to work with Igor Krutoi, changed her hair to her natural brunette, got married, had a grandson, and bought a house on the outskirts of Moscow.  Irina and Krutoi released two albums together, "I will disperse the clouds with my hands" and "Un-finished Romance" (1996, 1998).

Allegrova divorced, released a healing-themed album called "Teatr" (Theater) (1999) and went on tour around the world. In 2004, she received a star on the Star Square in Moscow.
 
In 2005, she began working exclusively with Aleksei Garnizov on "Po Lezviyu Lyubvi (On razor's edge of love) trilogy". A new album was planned for release in late 2005.

She has since written three novellas about love, and created an award ceremony where she and other stars give out the 'Golden Duck' to those journalists who made up the worst lies.

Allegrova announced that in March 2012 she will be retiring and went on a final tour, she is still doing concerts, however, very rarely. At the end of 2013, she released a new song with Russian singer Slava called "First Love, Last Love". She also made a song for the 2014 Winter Olympics in Sochi for ice hockey with past athletes of the sport.

Political views 
In the 1996 presidential election, Allegrova campaigned for Boris Yeltsin, participating in the "Vote or lose" election campaign.

Allegrova supports the Russian invasion of Ukraine and has used proceeds from concerts to support the Russian army.

In January 2023 Ukraine imposed sanctions on Irina Allegrova for promoting Russia during the 2022 Russian invasion of Ukraine. In February 2023 Canada sanctioned her for being involved in Russian propaganda and spreading misinformation relating to the war.

Discography

Studio albums
 Strannik moy (1992)
 Suzheny moy... (1994)
 Ugonshchitsa (1994)
 Ya tuchi razvedu rukami... (1996)
 Imperatritsa (1997)
 Nezakoncheny roman (1998)
 Teatr... (1999)
 Vsyo snachala... (2001)
 Po lezviyu lyubvi (2002)
 Popolam (with Mikhail Shufutinsky; 2004)
 S dnyom rozhdeniya! (2005)
 Allegrova 2007 (2007)
 Eksklyuzivnoye izdaniye (2010)
 Perezagruzka. Pererozhdeniye (2016)

Video albums
 Ya tuchi razvedu rukami (1996)
 Nezakoncheny roman Iriny Allegrovoy (1998)
 Ispoved (1998)
 Ispoved neslomlennoy zhenshchiny (2010)

Compilation albums
 Suzheny moy... (1994)
 The Best (2002)
 Luchshiye pesni (2002)
 Grand Collection (2002)
 Lyubovnoe nastroeniye (2003)
 Grand Collection (2009)
 O muzhchinach i dlya muzhchin (2019)
 S prazdnikom, dorogiye devchonki! (2019)
 Neizdannoe (2019)
 Semya. Lyubov. Vernost (2019)
 Mono... (2019)
 Luchshiye duety (2019)
 Byvshiye... (2020)

EPs
 S novym godom (2018)

Singles
 "Pervaya lyubov – lyubov poslednyaya" (with Slava; 2013)
 "Kino o ljubvi" (with Ivan; 2016)
 "Osen" (with Igor Krutoy; 2020)

References

External links
 

1952 births
Living people
Musicians from Rostov-on-Don
People's Artists of Russia
20th-century Russian singers
21st-century Russian singers
Russian people of Armenian descent
Russian pop singers
Soviet women singers
Honored Artists of the Russian Federation
Russian contraltos
20th-century Russian women singers
21st-century Russian women singers
Winners of the Golden Gramophone Award